The Extremist is the fourth studio album by guitarist Joe Satriani, released on July 21, 1992 through Relativity Records The album is one of Satriani's most popular releases and his highest-charting to date, reaching No. 22 on the U.S. Billboard 200 and remaining on that chart for 28 weeks, as well as reaching the top 50 in six other countries. Three singles reached Billboard'''s Mainstream Rock chart: "Summer Song" at No. 5, "Friends" at No. 12 and "Cryin'" at No. 24. The Extremist was certified Gold on December 22, 1992. and received a nomination for Best Rock Instrumental Performance at the 1993 Grammy Awards, Satriani's fourth such nomination.

Overview
"Rubina's Blue Sky Happiness" is dedicated to Satriani's wife Rubina, and is the second song named after her, following "Rubina" from Not of This Earth (1986). "Summer Song" has endured as one of Satriani's best-known songs and is a mainstay at his concerts; it was used by Sony in a commercial for the Walkman and was later included on the soundtrack to two of Sony's console video games: Formula 1 (1996) for the PlayStation and Gran Turismo 4 (2004) for the PlayStation 2. Two B-sides from The Extremists recording sessions, "Crazy" and "Banana Mango II", together with the outtakes "Thinking of You", "Speed of Light" and "Baroque", were later released on Satriani's 1993 double album Time Machine.

Reissues
The Extremist has been reissued several times. The first was in 1997 through Epic Records and again on June 16, 2008 as part of the Original Album Classics box set. The most recent reissue was part of The Complete Studio Recordings, released on April 22, 2014 through Legacy Recordings; this is a box set compilation containing remastered editions of every Satriani studio album from 1986 to 2013.

Critical reception

Phil Carter at AllMusic gave The Extremist four stars out of five, saying that the album lives up to its name. "Summer Song", "Friends", "Motorcycle Driver", and the title track were noted as highlights.

Track listing

Personnel

Joe Satriani – guitar, Dobro, keyboard, synthesizer, banjo, mandolin, bass (tracks 8, 10), harmonica, arrangement, mixing, producer
Phil Ashley – keyboard (track 6), synthesized strings, synthesized trumpet (track 10), squeezebox
Gregg Bissonette – drums (tracks 1–6, 8, 9)
Bongo Bob Smith – drums (track 8), percussion (track 8)
Simon Phillips – drums (tracks 5, 10), tambourine
Paulinho da Costa – percussion (tracks 2–4, 6, 8, 9)
Jeff Campitelli – cymbals (track 10)
Andy Johns – organ (tracks 2, 9), arrangement (track 1), engineering (tracks 1–9), mixing, production (tracks 1–9)
Brett Tuggle – organ (track 4)
Matt Bissonette – bass (tracks 1–6, 9)
Doug Wimbish – bass (track 5), spoken vocalsTechnical'''

John Cuniberti – engineering (tracks 5, 6, 8, 10), production (tracks 5, 6, 8, 10)
Bart Stevens – engineering assistance
Dan Bosworth – engineering assistance
Michael Semanick – engineering assistance
David Plank – engineering assistance
Michael Reiter – engineering assistance
Julie Last – engineering assistance
Bernie Grundman – mastering
Matt Mahurin – cover photography

Charts and certifications

Weekly charts

Certifications

Awards

References

External links
The Extremist at satriani.com
In Review: Joe Satriani "The Extremist" at Guitar Nine Records

Joe Satriani albums
1992 albums
Relativity Records albums
Albums produced by Andy Johns
Grammy Award for Best Rock Instrumental Performance